Maria Antonella Barucci is an Italian astronomer at the Observatory-Meudon, Paris. She is credited by the Minor Planet Center with a total of 3 minor planet discoveries she made in 1984 and 1985. Most notably is her joint discovery with R. Scott Dunbar of the near-Earth and Aten asteroid 3362 Khufu at Palomar Observatory, as well as her co-discovery of the Apollo asteroid 3752 Camillo.

Maria Antonella Barucci is also co-author of the astronomy and planetary science textbook The Solar System (2003) published by Springer-Verlag. The main-belt asteroid 3485 Barucci, discovered by American astronomer Edward Bowell in 1983, was named in her honor.

See also 
 Eleanor F. Helin, co-discoverer of 3752 Camillo
 Rosetta (spacecraft)

References

External links 
 Maria A. Barucci, individual member of the IAU – International Astronomical Union 
  study retrieved 12:07 11.10.11
  list of citations – M.A. Barucci at inspirehep.net
  list of citations – M. Barucci at inspirehep.net

Year of birth missing (living people)
Living people
Discoverers of minor planets

21st-century Italian astronomers
Italian women scientists
Women astronomers
Planetary scientists
Women planetary scientists